The 2012–13 South Carolina State Bulldogs basketball team represented South Carolina State University during the 2012–13 NCAA Division I men's basketball season. The Bulldogs, led by sixth year head coach Tim Carter, played their home games at the SHM Memorial Center and were members of the Mid-Eastern Athletic Conference. Murray Garvin became head coach when head coach Tim Carter resigned midway through the 2012-2013 season.

The team finished the season 6–24, 2–14 in MEAC play to finish in a tie for twelfth place. They lost in the first round of the MEAC tournament to Morgan State.

Roster

Schedule

|-
!colspan=9| Regular season

|-
!colspan=9| 2013 MEAC men's basketball tournament

References

South Carolina State Bulldogs basketball seasons
South Carolina State